Donald Leonard Logan (born 30 January 1931) was a rugby union player who represented Australia.

Logan, a scrum-half, was born in Sydney and claimed 1 international rugby cap for Australia on the Wallabies' 1957–58 Australia rugby union tour of Britain, Ireland and France.

References

Australian rugby union players
Australia international rugby union players
1931 births
Living people
Rugby union players from Sydney
Rugby union scrum-halves